Proteoceratidae is an extinct family of actively mobile aquatic carnivorous cephalopods belonging to the subclass Orthoceratoidea endemic to what would be Asia, Australia, Europe, South America and North America during the Ordovician living from 490—445.6 Ma, existing for approximately .

Taxonomy

Proteoceratidae was named by Flower (1962). Its type is Proteoceras. It was assigned to Michelinoceratida by Flower (1962); to Pseudorthocerataceae by Teichert et al. (1964), Sweet (1964) and Evans (1994); to Pseudorthocerida by Kröger and Isakar (2006); and to Orthocerida by Kröger et al. (2007).

Genera
 Archigeisonoceras
 Baykonuroceras
 Cyrtactinoceras
 Ephippiorthoceras
 Euorthoceras
 Gangshanoceras
 Gorbyoceras
 Isorthoceras
 Liulinoceras
 Mesnaquaceras
 Metephippiorthoceras
 Monomuchites
 Orthonybyoceras
 Paraproteoceras
 Proteoceras
 Pseudoliolinoceras
 Stereospyroceras
 Tofangoceras
 Transorthoceras
 Treptoceras
 Ulmioceras

References

External links 

Orthocerida
Ordovician cephalopods
Ordovician cephalopods of Asia
Ordovician cephalopods of Europe
Ordovician cephalopods of North America
Ordovician cephalopods of South America
Middle Ordovician first appearances
Early Cretaceous extinctions